Fox 2000 Pictures was an American film production company within The Walt Disney Studios. It was a sister studio of the larger film studio 20th Century Fox  and Fox Searchlight Pictures specializing in producing independent films in mid-range releases that largely targeted underserved groups. The company dissolved on May 14, 2021 following the release of The Woman in the Window on Netflix, and the acquisition of 21st Century Fox by The Walt Disney Company on March 20, 2019. Most films from Fox 2000 were released under the 20th Century Fox banner, and sometimes under Fox Searchlight Pictures.

Walt Disney Studios Motion Pictures distributed the films produced by Fox 2000 Pictures in theatrical markets, until its closure in 2021.

Fox 2000 Pictures had produced over 50 films. Fox 2000's Life of Pi was nominated for many awards and did well at the box office. Marley & Me was the largest Fox 2000 commercial success with a record for the largest Christmas Day box office ever with $14.75 million in ticket sales. The division's highest-grossing film was Life of Pi (2012) with $609 million.

History 
Fox 2000 Pictures formed as a division of 20th Century Fox in 1994 with Laura Ziskin as president. In May 1997, producer Art Linson moved his Knickerbocker Films banner from 20th Century Fox to Fox 2000 with a three-year, exclusive production agreement.
 
In 2000, Ziskin left the division and Elizabeth Gabler was hired to replace her. In February 2012, Gabler renewed her contract as president of Fox 2000.

Fox 2000 signed Karen Rosenfelt's Sunswept Entertainment to a first-look production deal. In July 2014, the division agreed to a three-year first-look production deal with Color Force, a production partnership of Nina Jacobson and Brad Simpson. The Jackal Group, a Fox Networks Group and Gail Berman partnership, signed a first-look feature film production deal with Fox 2000 for Berman in February 2015.

On March 20, 2019, The Walt Disney Company acquired a majority of 21st Century Fox, including Fox 2000. Disney originally announced that Fox 2000 would continue operating after the acquisition, which gave Disney 11 film units. However, the next day, The Hollywood Reporter reported that Disney would shut down the studio in October 2019 after The Woman in the Window. Deadline Hollywood was surprised as Fox 2000, considering to be ideal for streaming films, was the reason for the 21st Century Fox acquisition. However, Fox Searchlight Pictures is also an indie division leaving little room for Fox 2000. In August 2019, The Art of Racing in the Rain became the final theatrical film in the studio. The division shut down on May 14, 2021 after The Woman in the Window was delayed twice, first due to re-editing after test screenings and then the COVID-19 pandemic. On August 4, 2020, Disney sold the film to Netflix.

List of releases

References 

1994 establishments in California
20th Century Studios
2021 disestablishments in California
Companies based in Los Angeles
Defunct film and television production companies of the United States
Disney acquisitions
Disney production studios
Entertainment companies based in California
Entertainment companies established in 1994
Entertainment companies disestablished in 2021
Film distributors of the United States
Film production companies of the United States
Walt Disney Studios (division)
Former subsidiaries of The Walt Disney Company
Former News Corporation subsidiaries